Himayatnagar is a neighbourhood in Hyderabad, Telangana, India. It is also a mandal in Hyderabad District. It was named after Mir Himayat Ali Khan (Azam Jah), the 1st son of the last Nizam of Hyderabad.

Geography
Himayatnagar is located at the South Eastern side of Hussain Sagar. It adjoins the localities of Narayanguda, Basheerbagh and Hyderguda.

History
Himayatnagar developed into the residential and commercial frontier of the city around the mid-1960s

Transport 
TSRTC connects Himayatnagar to all parts of the city.

Major establishments
Himayatnagar has the offices of the Telangana State Tourism Development Corporation and the Telugu Academy.
Tirumala Tirupati Devasthanam has an office located at Himayatnagar. A noted center, Urdu Hall is located there.

Institutes
Hamstech Institute of Fashion & Interior Design is located here

Gallery

References

Neighbourhoods in Hyderabad, India